The 1931 Nobel Prize in Literature was posthumously awarded to the Swedish poet Erik Axel Karlfeldt (1864–1931) with the citation: "The poetry of Erik Axel Karlfeldt." He was the third Swede to win the prize and remains the only recipient to be posthumously awarded. Karlfeldt had been offered the award already in 1919 but refused to accept it, because of his position as permanent secretary to the Swedish Academy (1913–1931), which awards the prize.

Laureate

Erik Axel Karlfeldt's poetry is deeply rooted in the region he grew up in and its traditions. The region, however, increasingly became a microcosm to reflect the universal in his Vildmarks- och kärleksvisor ("Songs of Wilderness and of Love", 1895). His works are basically of an untamed nature, while characterized by austerity and a rejection of egotism, and often use his alter ego, "Fridolin", to represent his mood, yearnings, loss and humor as in his poems Fridolins visor ("Fridolin's Songs", 1898) and Fridolins lustgård ("Fridolin's Pleasure Garden", 1901). Karlfeldt's poems demonstrate a wonderful grasp of language. Despite his close connection with his native region and its traditions, he tested the possibilities presented by both his imagination and poetry as an art form. His last collection, Hösthorn ("The Horn of Autumn", 1927) was published four years before his death.

Deliberations

Nominations
Karlfeldt was nominated in 10 different occasions starting in 1916. In 1931, he received a single nomination from the 1930 Nobel Peace Prize laureate Nathan Söderblom, also a member of the Swedish Academy, with which he was awarded posthumously afterwards.

In total, the Nobel committee received 49 nominations for 29 individuals. Ten of the nominees are nominated first-time among them Hermann Hesse (awarded in 1946), Francis Jammes, Ole Edvart Rølvaag, Erich Maria Remarque, Ramón Pérez de Ayala, and Ramón Menéndez Pidal. The highest number of nominations were for the Spanish philologist Ramón Menéndez Pidal with 8 nominations followed by Concha Espina de la Serna with 6 nominations. Three of the nominees were women namely Concha Espina de la Serna, Laura Mestre Hevia, and Ivana Brlić-Mažuranić.

The authors Arnold Bennett, Hjalmar Bergman, Rachel Bluwstein, Hall Caine, Enrico Corradini, Ernst Didring, Max Elskamp, Khalil Gibran, Frank Harris, Mary St. Leger Kingsley (known as Lucas Malet), Vachel Lindsay, George Herbert Mead, John Gambril Nicholson, Arthur Schnitzler, Hara Prasad Shastri, John Lawson Stoddard, Milan Šufflay, Ida B. Wells, Xu Zhimo, and Ieronim Yasinsky died in 1931 without having been nominated for the prize. Norwegian-American author Ole Edvart Rølvaag died weeks before the announcement.

Award ceremony
His wife, Gerda Holmberg–Karlfeldt, was the one who received the Nobel diploma, medal and monetary prize worth SEK173,206 from King Gustaf V and permanent secretary, Per Hallström.

In the award ceremony held on 10 December 1931, Anders Österling, Swedish Academy member, explained the Nobel Committee's justification of awarding the prize posthumously, by saying:

Reactions
The prize was controversial not just because it was the first and only time the Nobel Prize in Literature was awarded posthumously, but because the Academy had previously awarded two other Swedish writers of the same literary era, Selma Lagerlöf in 1909 and Verner von Heidenstam in 1916. The prize decision was not well received in the Swedish press. In newspapers such as Dagens Nyheter and Stockholms Dagblad the Swedish Academy's decision to posthumously award an author, particularly one who had refused to accept it before, was questioned and said to be against the purpose of the award. A positive reaction was however expressed in Svenska Dagbladet saying that while the award to Karlfeldt was surprising it "on closer deliberation prove to be not just justifiable but beautiful". Internationally, it was heavily criticized as few had heard of Karlfeldt.

Notes

References

External links
Award ceremony speech by Anders Österling nobelprize.org

1931